"Found Out About You" is the fourth single from American rock band Gin Blossoms' second studio album, New Miserable Experience (1992). Written by lead guitarist Doug Hopkins, who was fired from the band after the album, it first appeared on their 1989 debut recording, Dusted.

Background
"Found Out About You" was written by Hopkins in the mid-1980s and was the first song that singer Robin Wilson recalled demoing with the band when he joined. Wilson explained,

 Hopkins had high hopes for making a hit. Wilson recalled that Hopkins was "very specific" about how the vocals for the song turned out.

The song was a favorite of the band's, with both Wilson and drummer Phillip Rhodes naming it as Hopkins's best song. Rhodes commented, "In my opinion, that is the best song he ever wrote, and it is the best song on the record." Wilson explained, "I knew that song had to be the best vocal of my entire life. I knew that song had to be perfect, at least from my angle. Everybody else did it perfectly, and I had to rise up to the challenge as well....He wanted it to be a hit record and I'm glad it is; it's a great song."

Release
"Found Out About You" reached number 25 on the US Billboard Hot 100, making it the second single from the album (after "Hey Jealousy") to enter the top 40. The song found the most success in Canada, where it reached number three on the RPM Top Singles chart. Elsewhere, the song barely reached the top 40 in the United Kingdom and peaked at number 94 on Australia's ARIA Singles Chart in September 1994.

Critical reception
"Found Out About You" saw praise from music critics. Ed Masley of The Arizona Republic listed the song as the Gin Blossoms' second best song on his list of their top 30 tracks, writing, "There's a haunting, almost psychedelic quality to the interweaving guitar lines and overall vibe of 'Found Out About You,' at once recalling R.E.M. at their hypnotic best and something closer to garage rock."

Track listings
US cassette single
A. "Found Out About You" – 3:53
B. "Hands Are Tied" – 3:17

UK 7-inch single
A. "Found Out About You" – 3:53
B. "Hey Jealousy" (live) – 3:59

UK and European CD single
 "Found Out About You" – 3:53
 "Hey Jealousy" (live) – 3:59
 "Hold Me Down" (live) – 4:35
 "Mrs Rita" (live) – 4:20

Charts

Weekly charts

Year-end charts

Release history

See also
 Number one modern rock hits of 1994

References

1989 songs
1993 singles
A&M Records singles
Fontana Records singles
Gin Blossoms songs
Songs written by Doug Hopkins
Jangle pop songs